Sattam Oru Vilaiyattu is a 1987 Indian Tamil-language vigilante action film, directed by S. A. Chandrasekhar and produced by Shoba Chandrasekhar. The film stars Vijayakanth, Radha and Ravichandran. It revolves around a man seeking to avenge the murder of his mother and younger brother. The film was released on 21 October 1987.

Plot 

As a boy, Raja saw his mother and younger brother murdered. He saw too that his police inspector father DCP Needhi Manikkam was powerless to get the murderer convicted as there was no evidence.

As a young man under the name of Vijay, he gets even with the criminal Mathappu Sundaram killing each one of his three sons. One under water, the second from a mountain peak, the third murder is made to look as it were an accident with the car carrying the victim hurtling off the peak.

Cast

Soundtrack 
The music was composed by M. S. Viswanathan.

Release and reception 
Sattam Oru Vilaiyattu was released on 21 October 1987, alongside another Vijayakanth film Uzhavan Magan. However, both films went on to become super hits at the box office. The Indian Express wrote, "The screenplay is utterly contrived and there is nothing new either in M. Karunanidhi's dialogues [..] or S. A. Chandrasekhar's treatment which is as hackneyed as ever".

References

External links 
 

1980s Tamil-language films
1980s vigilante films
1987 action films
1987 films
Films directed by S. A. Chandrasekhar
Films scored by M. S. Viswanathan
Indian action films
Indian vigilante films